Portal Through Time is an original novel based on the U.S. television series Buffy the Vampire Slayer. It was published in 2006. The author, Alice Henderson, also wrote, Night Terrors in the Stake Your Destiny series. In this novel, Buffy and her friends time-travel to four different periods of history to protect Slayers of the past from present-day vampires.

Plot summary
An artifact has been forged which enables time-travelling spells while it remains in Sunnydale. A group of vampire-assassins are travelling into the past in an attempt to kill previous Slayers, and disrupt the Slayer lineage. They are led by the spellcaster Lucien, whose aim is to ensure that Buffy does not interfere with the ascension of the Master. When they discover that killing Buffy in the past merely changes the way in which the Master is killed, they become frustrated and decide to go further back.

When Buffy becomes aware of their plans, the vampires have already left and she is forced to follow them into the past. With Giles, Willow and Xander, she travels to first-century Anglesey in Wales where a Druidic stronghold is being invaded by Romans. Next they travel to Uruk in ancient Sumer where they encounter Gilgamesh. Xander inadvertently arouses a plague god, and Willow accidentally summons a snake-demon while trying to banish the god.

Then they return to the American Civil War period, where they find themselves in the middle of the Battle of Shiloh. They destroy many vampires feeding on the soldiers. Finally they head for Paris during the French Revolution where they witness executions on the guillotine and meet Angelus and Darla.

Continuity

Timing

The starting point of the novel is in 1998, during Buffy season 2. It is months after the destruction of the Master's bones, during which time the vampire Lucien perfected the time-travelling spell. Buffy is 16. Angel is still ensouled.
The Buffy books are listed in order of chronology in a navigation box at the bottom of this article.

Canonical issues

Buffy novels, such as this one are generally not considered by fans as part of canon. They are usually not viewed as official Buffyverse reality, but are novels from the authors' imaginations. However unlike fanfic, 'overviews' summarising their story, written early in the writing process, were 'approved' by Fox, who in turn may or may not have sought approval from Whedon (or his office). The book will be published as official Buffy merchandise.

Canon characters in the novel include: Buffy, Angel, Giles, Xander, Willow, Darla and Angelus.

External links
Simonsays.com - Publisher's webpage for this book
Whedonesque.com - Whedonesquers discuss the book in April 2006
Review of Portal Through Time at www.sci-fi-online.com

2006 novels
Books based on Buffy the Vampire Slayer
Science fantasy novels
Novels about time travel
Cultural depictions of Gilgamesh
Novels set in Wales
Novels set in the Ancient Near East
Novels set during the American Civil War
Novels set in the French Revolution